Wedgewood Village Amusement Park was an amusement park in Oklahoma City, Oklahoma. It was originally started in 1955 by Maurice Woods and located at May and NW 58th street, where it was known as Duffys Golf. Maurice started to notice that wives and children were sitting in their cars while their husbands used the driving range. Thus, the idea was to place a few kiddie rides to keep them occupied. The rides became so popular that Maurice decided to acquire the land at 63rd and N.W. Expressway where he built Wedgewood Village (named after the idea of a wedge and wood golf club). It opened in 1958 and lasted until 1969. Most of the rides were sold after the 1968 season. The park sported a number of rides, most notably the Tornado coaster.

Tornado
The Tornado was a wooden roller coaster built and designed by John C. Allen and the Philadelphia Toboggan Company. After 1962, the lift hill led directly into a turn before the first drop, and a new high turn was added at the station end, with the rest of the ride maintaining its pre-expansion configuration  The trains are now operating at Stricker's Grove in Ohio on a roller coaster also called The Tornado.

Other
Maurice Woods died in July 2008. He was working on a Wedgewood coffee table book at the time.

The olympic regulation size pool is still in existence and the Wedgewood Apartments have now been built around it.

References

External links
Wedgewood Village Tribute Site
Amusement park lives on in the memories of its fans

Amusement parks in Oklahoma
1955 establishments in Oklahoma
1969 disestablishments in Oklahoma
Defunct amusement parks in the United States
Buildings and structures in Oklahoma City
Amusement parks opened in 1955
Amusement parks closed in 1969